I Learned It from Father is a 1964 German comedy film directed by Axel von Ambesser and starring Willy Fritsch, Thomas Fritsch and Gertraud Jesserer. The son of a respectable industrialist leads a wild second life.

Cast
 Willy Fritsch ...  Clemens Andermann
 Thomas Fritsch ...  Andreas Andermann
 Gertraud Jesserer ...  Monika Holl
 Peter Vogel ...  Oskar Werner Vischer
 Marianne Chappuis ...  Christa Seebald
 Barbara Stanyk ...  Ebba Pedersen
 Paul Hörbiger ...  Julius Knackert
 Peter Matic ...  Joachim Lange
 Franz Stoss ...  Sebastian Delt
 Fritz Muliar ...  Hans Sax
 Ljuba Welitsch ...  Managerin Neumann
 Susi Nicoletti ...  Dora Bauer
 Marianne Schönauer ...  Therese
 Guido Wieland ...  Bankdirektor
 Karl Böhm ...  Tettelmann

References

External links

1964 films
1964 comedy films
German comedy films
Austrian comedy films
West German films
1960s German-language films
Films directed by Axel von Ambesser
1960s German films